Prisca Chilufya (born 8 June 1999) is a Zambian footballer who plays as a midfielder. She has been a member of the Zambia women's national team.

Club career
Chilufya has played for Red Arrows FC.

International career
Chilufya played for Zambia at senior level in the 2018 Africa Women Cup of Nations qualification (second round).

References

1999 births
Living people
Zambian women's footballers
Women's association football midfielders
Red Arrows F.C. players
BIIK Kazygurt players
Zambia women's international footballers
Zambian expatriate women's footballers
Zambian expatriate sportspeople in Kazakhstan
Expatriate women's footballers in Kazakhstan